Lysekloster Idrettslag is a Norwegian multi-sports club from Lysefjorden, Os, Vestland. It has sections for association football, handball and athletics.

The men's football team plays in the 3. divisjon, the fourth tier of Norwegian football. The team had a spell in the 2016 2. divisjon and has since been a contestant for repromotion.

Players

Current squad

Other players under contract

References

Official site

Football clubs in Norway
Sport in Hordaland
Os, Hordaland
1946 establishments in Norway
Association football clubs established in 1946
Athletics clubs in Norway